Serenade is an Australian television series which aired 1959 to 1960 on Sydney station ATN-7. It was a music series featuring singer Ray Melton, though several episodes instead featured singer Peggy Brooks. Little else is known about the series.

Broadcast 10:30PM on Mondays. According to a contemporary TV listing, it competed in its time-slot against news on ABN-2 and films on TCN-9.

References

External links
Serenade at IMDb

1959 Australian television series debuts
1960 Australian television series endings
Australian music television series
Black-and-white Australian television shows
English-language television shows